The 1989 Women's Hockey Asia Cup was the second edition of the Women's Hockey Asia Cup. It was held in Hong Kong from 12 December to 17 December 1985.

China won the group to win the title, with Japan finishing second while South Korea took the third place.

Teams

Results

Table

Matches

Winners

Final standings

See also
 1989 Men's Hockey Asia Cup

References

International field hockey competitions hosted by Hong Kong
Women's Hockey Asia Cup
Asia Cup
Women's Hockey Asia Cup
Hockey Asia Cup